BAE Morán Valverde may refer to:

 , the former American  USS Enright (DE-216); acquired by the Ecuadorian Navy in July 1967 as BAE 25 de Julio (E-12); renamed Morán Valverde (D-01), 1975; scrapped 1989
 BAE Morán Valverde (FM-02) (Leander class), the former British  HMS Danae (F47); commissioned by the Ecuadorian Navy in 1991; decommissioned in 2008
 BAE Morán Valverde (FM-02) (Condell class), the former Chilean  Almirante Lynch (PFG-07); purchased by the Ecuadorian Navy in 2008 and in active service

See also
Morán Valverde (disambiguation)

Ecuadorian Navy ship names